Multiple Sclerosis Research Australia, better known as MS Research Australia, is a national not-for-profit organisation that coordinates and funds multiple sclerosis research in Australia. Its research arm claims to be the top national advocacy body and largest national not-for-profit dedicated to facilitating and funding research into Multiple Sclerosis for people in Australia living with MS

Founding 
MS Research Australia was established in 2004 with Simon McKeon (2011 Australian of the Year, who was himself diagnosed with MS in 2001) as Founding Chair from its inauguration until 2010. McKeon handed over to current Chair Mr Paul Murnane but remains involved as the organisation's patron. Founding CEO, Mr Jeremy Wright, handed over to current CEO, Dr Matthew Miles, in 2013. MS Research Australia was created as an MS-specific national research initiative that sought to harness the strengths of the Australian science community (including neurobiology, immunology, genetics, epidemiology, and social & applied abilities), and provide a unified collaborative approach to MS research.

Progress 
The organisation claims that, since its establishment in 2004, over $36.7 million has been awarded to 254 MS research projects across both Australia and New Zealand.

Role in the Global MS Community 
MS Research Australia is a managing member of the International Progressive MS Alliance, which focuses on progressive multiple sclerosis.

MS Research Australia is a contributor to the Multiple Sclerosis International Federation (MSIF), based in London, which has over 20 countries as members.

Key Achievements 
MS Research Australia claims to have played a key role in several significant breakthroughs in the scientific community's understanding of MS.

MS Research Australia provides funding for the Vitamin D MS prevention trial (known as PrevANZ) to test whether Vitamin D supplementation can prevent MS in those who are at risk of developing the disease. The organisation claims this study is a world-first clinical trial that had similar results to an earlier study published in Neurological Research International.

The organisation supported the Australian New Zealand MS Genetics Consortium, which in 2009 discovered two of the key risk genes in MS and MS Research Australia claims to have subsequently contributed to the International MS Genetics Consortium that has now discovered over 200 genes that contribute to the risk of developing MS.

In 2017, research funded by the organisation discovered a possible molecular pathway (the kynurenine pathway) for MS progression, the activation of which may be involved in MS progression. This pathway has already been implicated in other neurological disorders and further study is ongoing.

In the same year, Macquarie University declared that through research enabled by MS Research Australia, "one of the early and ongoing supporters of this work," the University discovered the first blood biomarker for MS. The blood test developed by Macquarie University researches can distinguish between relapsing and progressive forms of MS with 85-90% accuracy, and the University claims a clinical blood test could be available within two years.

Also in 2017, MS Research Australia co-funded a three-year, $750 000 multiple sclerosis paired research fellowship, funding a senior laboratory research fellow and senior MS clinician at the University of Tasmania’s Menzies Institute for Medical Research, with the aim of furthering research into developing treatments for MS.

Awards

2015 
- Australian Charity Awards’ Charity of the Year.

- Public Relations Institute of Australia (PRIA) Golden Target Awards – ‘Highly Commended’ in the Small Budget/Pro Bono category.

2016 
- Fundraising Institute of Australia's ‘Most Effective Creative Campaign Award for Kiss Goodbye to MS.

- Fundraising Institute of Australia’s ‘Special Events Under $5 Million’.

- Australian Charity Awards’ ‘Outstanding Achievement Award’.

2017 
- Telstra Business Awards, ‘Australian Charity of the Year’.

- Telstra Business Awards, 'NSW Charity of the Year'.

- Telstra Business Awards, 'NSW Business of the Year'.

- Australian Charity Awards, ‘Outstanding Achievement Award’.

Campaigns 
MS Research Australia launched a global fundraising campaign, Kiss Goodbye to MS, in 2012. The campaign, which MSIF claims is the first truly international fundraising campaign for MS, was launched to both advance public awareness of the disease, and to raise funds for ongoing research. Since the establishment of the campaign, Kiss Goodbye to MS is now operating in over 15 different countries, and is the only global campaign dedicated solely to fundraise for MS research.

MS Research Australia Platforms 
In partnership with other key Australian organisations, MS Research Australia funds and supports a number of MS research collaborations. These platforms, often national in reach, exist to fill gaps in knowledge about specific areas and priority interest areas for people affected by MS.

- MS Research Australia Brain Bank

- Australian MS Longitudinal Study (AMSLS)

- PrevANZ. A clinical prevention trial into the effects of vitamin D on MS.

- ANZgene. A collaborative Australia-New Zealand genetics study seeking to identify the genes linked with MS.

- Autologous Haemopoetic Stem Cell Treatment (AHSCT) registry.

- NSW Clinical trials and MS research network.

References 

Health charities in Australia
Medical and health organisations based in New South Wales
Multiple sclerosis organizations
Charity shops